National Highway 127D, commonly called NH 127D is a national highway in  India. It is a spur road of National Highway 27.  NH-127D traverses the state of Assam in India. This highway is located in Kamrup district of Assam. It stretches from Baihata Chariali To Indo-Bhutan border through Goreswar & Naokata.

Route 
Baihata Chariali - Indo/Bhutan border near Samdrup Junjkhar in Bhutan.

Junctions  

  Terminal near Baihata Chariali.

See also 

 List of National Highways in India
 List of National Highways in India by state

References

External links 

 NH 127D on OpenStreetMap

National highways in India
National Highways in Assam